A concept musical is a work of musical theatre whose book and score are structured around conveying a theme or message, rather than emphasizing a narrative plot.

Two 1940s shows compete for the title of "first concept musical": Allegro and Love Life. The form began to flourish in the late 1960s, with the advent and subsequent popularity of Man of La Mancha, Cabaret, and Hair. Stephen Sondheim, the most prolific author of concept musicals, created Company in 1970, bringing the genre to the forefront of the commercial realm. Director-choreographer Bob Fosse and producer-director Harold Prince were equally instrumental in making defining contributions to the concept musical. Modern examples of the concept musical include Assassins and Avenue Q. Shows ranging from Fiddler on the Roof to Sweeney Todd have been argued as being concept musicals, though there is little critical agreement.

The concept musical has direct ties to the megamusical, which has similar roots in the Andrew Lloyd Webber work Cats, and the similarly plotless revue. Mirroring the social upheaval of the 1960s and beyond, the concept musical as a form provided a means of expression and experimentation for musical theatre writers and audiences alike.

Definition
"The term 'concept musical' did not appear in theatrical scholarship until after 1970, when the phrase "conceived by" preceded Michael Bennett’s name in the A Chorus Line billing. Most theater historians agree that the terms 'concept' and 'musical' were not linked until 1968, in a New York Times review of Zorba by critic Martin Gottfried. Referring to Harold Prince's direction rather than the show itself, Gottfried wrote: "Conception is the big word here - it is what is coming to replace the idea of a 'book'... there is even less room than in the usual musical [for story] because Prince's concept... apparently won out on every question about cutting." In a later review of Sondheim's Follies, Gottfried defined it as "a show whose music, lyrics, dance, stage movement and dialogue are woven through each other in the creation of a tapestry-like theme (rather than in support of a plot)."

Modern critics disagree as to the exact definition of the concept musical. It is generally agreed upon that in a concept musical, emphasis is placed upon style, message, and thematic metaphor rather than on the plot itself. Thus, the show's structure is rarely cohesive or linear.  Critics agree that the most defining aspect of a concept musical is its use of theme. This holistic approach to each show, which focuses on the truthful representation of the theme in every aspect of the final production, sets it apart from other musical theatre forms. Young-Gerber states: "In musical comedy there is no theme. The revue uses a theme to unify disparate musical numbers and specialty acts. The integrated musical contains a theme. In contrast, the concept musical embodies a theme [that is] developed as the musical is written."

Thus, the concept musical can also be defined by its structural characteristics and common staging techniques. Its songs "punctuate rather than flow out from the story," serving as a means of self-reflection for the character and acting as commentary upon the theme. The message of the show often spurs within its director a "renewed emphasis on the visual aspects of the performance... [leading] to a more abstract, unrealistic, non-representational staging, as the director has to free himself/herself from the confines of scenic verisimilitude in order to explore the visual dynamics of the stage." The attention paid to visual presentation has led many critics to recognize the concept musical as the most expressive and imagistic form of musical theatre. Theatre historian Vagelis Siropoulos writes: "A sense of aesthetic totality is provided not by the linear unfolding of a narrative but by the overarching staging concept, which turns the spectator's attention to the overall principle of organization in the same way that an abstract painting does."

History

Origin

The concept musical can be recognized as an extension of the growing concern for the cohesiveness of a particular production: "Unlike Rodgers and Hammerstein or Lerner and Loewe, who simply found a good story and musicalized it, now it was considered appropriate (and artistically more satisfying) to have a vision of the whole show." Leonard Bernstein was a key figure in this movement, with his shows Candide and West Side Story representing a "radical experiment in book writing" in which the book is controlled by theme and metaphor.

The concept musical's non-linear structure and focus on theme are suggestive of the works of Bertolt Brecht. A similar connection can be made to the Living Newspapers of the 1930s. The Broadway production of Lady in the Dark, written by Kurt Weill, Ira Gershwin, and Moss Hart, is considered by some to be a predecessor of the modern concept musical. Its attention to characters and their psychological makeup, rather than the plot and its through-line, foreshadow the concept musical's priority of personal expression. Following Lady in the Dark and throughout the course of his career, Weill favored ideas over a linear narrative. Whatever the exact origin, the growing maturation of musical theatre allowed the genre to become "a vehicle for social commentary and experimentation in form," with the concept musical at the forefront of this movement.

First concept musical

There are two major contenders for the title of first concept musical, although the term itself had yet to be invented: Allegro (1947) by Rodgers and Hammerstein, and Love Life (1948) by Weill and Lerner.

Allegro, which concerns a son following in his father's footsteps, represents a "musical experiment" conducted by Rodgers and Hammerstein. Defying "virtually all musical theatre conventions" of the time, its Greek chorus frequently interrupts the narrative, and the show focuses on a larger theme of personal struggle in the face of success. Minimalist in its staging, patterns of light were used to represent both spaces and emotions. However, many critics disagree as to Allegros status as a concept musical, stating that the linear nature of the plot continues regardless of the choral interludes. The show was a critical failure, which many theatre historians blame on the inexperience of director-choreographer Agnes de Mille. Disheartened, Rodgers and Hammerstein returned to a more traditional format. Whether or not it was indeed a concept musical or merely a predecessor of things to come, Allegro "opened the door to a splendid new way of writing for musical theatre." Allegro also provides a connection between the concept musical and Stephen Sondheim, who was mentored by Hammerstein and worked as a production assistant on Allegro.

Love Life, the story of a marriage lasting over a century, "disregarded the traditional use of time, interrupted its action with jolting vaudeville numbers that commented on the story, and... tried to illustrate sociological ideas by paralleling them to a long-term personal relationship." Freed from his usual partnership with Loewe, Lerner's growing experimentation with the genre is represented in Love Life. Like Allegro, Love Lifes narrative is not explicitly linear, exploring the theme of marriage through a variety of lenses. Sondheim has stated that Love Life was "a useful influence on my own work, but it failed because it started out with an idea rather than a character."

Development

1960s
Concept musicals began to emerge as a significant form in the early 1960s. Their fragmented approach to storytelling helped to revitalize musical theatre as a genre, which was becoming formulaic. 1961 saw the premiere of The Fantasticks and Stop the World – I Want to Get Off. In 1965, Man of La Mancha premiered at the Goodspeed Opera House, eventually transferring to Broadway. The "antithesis of what people expected musicals to be," it was nonetheless popular, and marked a growing undercurrent of rebellion against the traditional musical theatre model.

Cabaret premiered on Broadway in 1966, directed by Harold Prince, whose impact "on the concept musical is significant, and he can be considered the primary director who contributed to its creation." The show features songs that comment on the action within the narrative frame of the musical's Kit Kat Klub setting. Removed from the story, these songs serve as commentary in the style of Brecht and Weill's The Threepenny Opera.

One of the first rock musicals, Hair, opened Off-Broadway at The Public Theater in 1967 and then on Broadway in 1968. Representative of a communal 1960s "happening," it effectively "provided 'safe' exposure to the counterculture for middle-class audiences."

1970s

"The concept musical truly arrived with Company, a musical that managed to be palatable to audiences even as it broke just about every rule of musical comedy." The 1970 show, with music and lyrics by Sondheim and a book by George Furth, focuses on Bobby, a single man living in New York City on the eve of his thirty-fifth birthday. It examines his romantic and personal relationships with several girlfriends and a variety of his married friends. The success of Company paved the way for more adventurous concept musicals by Sondheim and others.

Director-choreographer Bob Fosse was a key figure in the further development of the concept musical. After directing the film version of Cabaret, Fosse helped to shape the 1972 Broadway musical Pippin, written by Stephen Schwartz and Roger Hirson. Fosse’s conceptual vision for Chicago, which opened on Broadway in 1975, featured vaudeville routines that "comment[ed] on the system of justice and imprisonment in Chicago in the 1920s... Kander and Ebb and Fosse and Prince were advancing upon the convention by which characters have two modes of existence in musicals. They were taking the convention literally, putting show business settings next to 'real' settings... and letting the two overlap."

A Chorus Line marked the first use of the word "conception" in connection with musical theatre. The show, based on interviews with actual dancers, uses the premise of an audition to expose the complex lives of previously-faceless chorus members. Considered by many to be the quintessential concept musical, the popularity of the 1975 New York Shakespeare Festival/Public Theater production and its subsequent Broadway transfer kicked the growing concept musical phenomenon into high gear.

1980s and beyond

Cats, first brought to the stage in 1981, "heralded the dawning of a new postmodern musical era, encapsulating the major difference between the concept musical and the megamusical." Though critics agree that the show is based around a concept rather than a linear plot, author Andrew Lloyd Webber had intended to create a show that was not meant to "reflect [or] comment on the world, even in an oblique, metaphorical way." This was a drastic difference from the metaphors that defined the concept musical. Thus, the concept musical branched out into the megamusical, which utilizes spectacle and increased technology to "radicalize the imagistic potential of musical theatre."

Starlight Express, an "experiment" by Lloyd Webber, debuted on the West End in 1984 and on Broadway in 1987. Like Cats, the show focuses on a central theme rather than a linear plot, with the entire cast on roller skates playing trains. The original concept was to be an "entertainment 'event' for children who love trains." Lloyd Webber has been quoted as saying that the end result was "not quite what we intended," given that the "joy and sense of pure fun that was the original intention seemed to get lost."

Avenue Q, which premiered on Broadway at the John Golden Theatre in 2003, can also be considered a concept musical. Authors Jeff Whitty, Jeff Marx, and Bobby Lopez have spoken of their difficulty categorizing the show: they wanted something that "didn't move like a story," but was not a true revue. Lopez calls it the "hybrid king of revue-slash-show. Using kind of Internet logic. A hyperlink type of logic to go from one subject to another." Its structure is circular, utilizing a series of vignettes and isolated situations to comment on the central idea. The show's theme, like Pippin, focuses on the central character's coming of age search for his purpose. Young-Gerber finds that none of the scenes "bring him closer to discovering his purpose, indicating that the events of the musical will continue after the section shared with the audience is completed."

Stephen Sondheim

Sondheim is considered by a number of critics to be the leading musical theatre composer of his time. His contributions to the concept musical as a genre are undisputed. Sondheim believed that every show, concept musical or not, should contain "a secret metaphor that nobody knows except the authors." Theatre historian Foster Hirsch wrote that, like Prince, Sondheim had "instincts in [his] approach... that echo Brecht and Weill," an opinion that is echoed by many others. The themes and issues presented in his concept musicals are intended to confront the audience rather than provide them with a means of escape. Sondheim stated that his primary principle when writing was that "content dictates form," meaning that the true heart of any issue must be presented in a similar fashion. This approach often led him to embrace the concept musical.

After the success of Company, Sondheim continued to experiment with the concept musical form. Follies opened in 1971 on Broadway at the Winter Garden Theatre, winning the Tony Award for Best Music and Lyrics and the New York Drama Critics' Circle award for Best Musical. It was directed by Prince and Bennett, with choreography by Bennett. A number of critics have argued that Follies can be taken for a commentary on America under the Nixon presidency. In true Sondheim fashion, its content defines its form: the parallelisms of the young versions of the four leads, mirrored against their older selves, create multiple structural permutations and confrontations. These combinations thereby break down a linear sense of narrative. Set against a backdrop of aging glamour and the roads not taken, the show "belies Sondheim's preoccupation with choice and its consequences, or rather subverts it into an understanding that making a mess of choices or being unable to choose at all is a constant."

Pacific Overtures "is often seen as the most obscure of Sondheim's scores," though a theme of naive illusion maturing to acceptance can be delineated. The show, directed by Prince, opened in 1976 on Broadway at the Winter Garden Theatre, winning the Drama Critics Circle award for Best Musical. Sondheim explained the "naive linear approach" of his writing process for Pacific Overtures: "What we actually did was to create a mythical Japanese playwright in our heads, who has come to New York, seen a couple of Broadway shows, and then goes back home and writes a musical about Commodore Perry's visit to Japan. It's this premise that helped to give us tone and style for the show." The traditional forms of kabuki and vaudeville were mixed to present a unique viewpoint. Assassins, which was directed by Jerry Zaks and opened in 1991 Off-Broadway at Playwrights Horizons, has no protagonist or linear plot. The show, shifting back and forth chronologically, explores the motives and efforts of the successful and would-be assassins of various United States presidents. Its number of short scenes, many of which are crude and slapstick, echo the structure of Company.

Several other Sondheim musicals, including Merrily We Roll Along, Sweeney Todd, and Sunday in the Park With George have also been argued by some critics as meeting the definition of a concept musical, though this status is debated. Merrily We Roll Along, which follows a trio of friends backwards from retirement to young adulthood, can be compared to Allegro in structure and theme, though the former has a narrative, while the latter does not.

Criticism

Much has been written about the importance and impact of the concept musical. Drama theorist and critic Kathryn Edney believes that the concept musical "is rarely popular or particularly profitable, although it often garners critical praise, scholarly attention, and a cult following among the musical theater cognoscenti." She postulates that the discrepancies between the concept musical and megamusical are a direct result of the efforts of Sondheim and Lloyd Webber, whose "competing musical and personal styles... polarized fans of this genre. One is not supposed to enjoy both Cats and Company." Likewise considering the relationship between the concept musical and megamusical, Siropoulos finds that the concept musical "is the product of a culture permeated by spectacle... The concept musical's disproportional concentration on the visual aspects of performance goes hand in hand with representational ends, an obligation to represent, however obliquely, the external world."

Siropoulos also argues that Prince, over any of his peers, is the true link between the concept musical and megamusical. Prince's work on Company and Evita, in particular, showcase his abilities in directing two distinct styles. 

Dramaturg Scott McMillin argues that the concept musical built upon the theories of Rodgers and Hammerstein to bring the genre into the modern era, allowing the musical to become "arguably the major form of drama produced so far in America." 

Theatre historian John Bush Jones argues that the concept musical undermines the role of the traditional musical as a narrative medium, proposing that the term 'concept musical' is "too broad to be of much value," suggesting instead the term 'fragmented musical'.

References

Musical theatre